Footballism is an Iranian, Persian language, popular weekly television program broadcast by Channel 3 in Iran. The host of the program is Amirali Nabavian. The main subject of the program is the criticism of the sociopolitical aspects of football.

Reception
Farheekhtegan published a paper on the strengths and weaknesses of the program.

References

Iranian television shows
Association football television series
2018 Iranian television series debuts
2010s Iranian television series
Islamic Republic of Iran Broadcasting original programming
Persian-language television shows
Criticism of sports